Portal de Archivos Españoles (PARES) is a documentary archive established and hosted by the Spanish Ministry of Education. It offers free access to digitized images of the Spanish Archives. It was opened in 2007. On 10 May 2016 it was updated to PARES 2.0, with more than 33.9 million digital images and 8.6 million document archives.

References

External links
 

Archives in Spain
2007 establishments in Spain
Internet properties established in 2007